Shannondale is an unincorporated community in Chariton County, in the U.S. state of Missouri.

History
Shannondale was platted in 1874 by Charles Shannon, and named for him.  A post office called Shannondale was established in 1874, and remained in operation until 1915.

References

Unincorporated communities in Chariton County, Missouri
Unincorporated communities in Missouri